Karumb Ilyas is a town in  Gujar Khan Tehsil, Punjab, Pakistan. Karumb Ilyas is also chief town of Union Council Karumb Ilyas which is an administrative subdivision of the Tehsil. Current Chairman of Union Council Karumb Ilyas is Chairman Yahya Faiz.

References

Union_councils_of_Rawalpindi_District

Populated places in Gujar Khan Tehsil
Union councils of Gujar Khan Tehsil